Middlefaire is a festival site located near Hillsboro, Texas.

The 21-acre site opened in 2006 and features four festivals.  These are Texas Pirate Festival held in June, Magical & Medieval Fantasy Faire in early October, Arts & Crafts Fair in late October and Renaissance Festival in November.  During the Texas Pirate Festival & The Renaissance Festival, the faire is presided over by the court of Queen Claude of France, played by Deborah Papst. Other notable figures are the Duke of Orleans played by Dean Papst. During the Fantasy Faire a number of courts are present including the fairy court; presided over by Pebbles the Fairy (Chelsea Craig), unseelie court, a creatures court with a Minotaur King and others.

History
Middlefaire first opened with the Renaissance Festival on the weekend of October 14 and 15 in 2006.  The 21-acre fair was created and is owned by K. G. "Paul" Tuma, better known to fair-goers as Paul Delacroix. The site features several permanent buildings, about half of which were built by merchants who sell at the site. They are arranged in a 17th-century English village.

The fair site is located at 8581 State Highway 171 at the intersection of County Road 1458, five miles north of Hillsboro.  All three fairs feature a variety of merchandise and entertainers typically singers, belly dancers, skits, musicians, pub sings, sword fights, jousting, pirate battles with historic working cannons, and other entertainments.  Flush toilets and camping are available on site.

The COVID-19 pandemic caused 2020's cancellation & deferral to 2021.

Attire
Entertainers and merchants typically dress to fit the theme of the particular faire. While the site is primarily mid 17th century, this is not strictly adhered to, especially with the fantasy-themed Magical & Medieval Fantasy Faire

References

External links 
 

Festivals in Texas
Renaissance fairs
Tourist attractions in Hill County, Texas